Piotr Banaszak (born 20 March 1964) is a Polish weightlifter. He competed in the men's heavyweight II event at the 1992 Summer Olympics.

References

1964 births
Living people
Polish male weightlifters
Olympic weightlifters of Poland
Weightlifters at the 1992 Summer Olympics
People from Inowrocław